Charles Thomas Coleman a.k.a. Chuck Coleman is an American aviator, aerospace engineer, airshow and test pilot. He has worked as a design and performance engineer for several aircraft corporations such as McDonnell Aircraft Corporation, Bede Jet Corporation and Scaled Composites. Coleman is a member of the Society of Test Pilots SETP as an Associate Fellow, and currently serves on the board of directors for the Mojave Air and Space Port As a commercial, test, and instructor pilot, he’s logged more than 10,800 hours of flight time.

Early life and education 
Coleman was raised in Ludington, Michigan by Thomas Coleman and JoAnn (Benedict) Smith. He graduated from the University of Michigan in 1985 with a Bachelor's of Science in Aerospace/Mechanical Engineering.

Career 
Coleman was a design engineer for 6 years at McDonnell Aircraft Corporation in St. Louis, Missouri where he was involved in military jet projects including serving as the Senior Design Engineer on the High Angle of Attack Research Vehicle (HARV), a modified F/A-18 Hornet, utilized by NASA to investigate controlled flight at high alpha utilizing thrust vectoring.

Coleman also served as a Senior Engineer on the F/A-18 conversion from combat-ready aircraft into performance planes for the United States Navy Blue Angels flight demonstration squadron.

He was a project engineer at the Bede Jet Corporation in Chesterfield, Missouri at the Spirit of St. Louis Airport. He served as the test pilot on the BD-10, a kit-built experimental jet aircraft, and BD-12, a two-seat experimental plane with a pusher configuration.

Coleman joined Scaled Composites in Mojave, California as a performance engineer, test pilot, and chase pilot in 2002. he was on a team of five engineers that designed, constructed and flight tested the Virgin Atlantic GlobalFlyer which was the first jet powered aircraft to fly around the world non-stop un-refueled.

Coleman was also a test pilot for the Proteus high altitude jet and tested Tier One Navigation System for the SpaceShipOne addition to conducting high G astronaut training for SpaceShipOne astronauts and served as the chase pilot for the SpaceShipOne. Coleman also served as a test pilot for Icon A-5, The ICON A5 is an American amphibious light-sport aircraft.

Performance 
Coleman has performed at numerous airshows and flown aerobatics planes for Patty Wagstaff, Gene Soucy, Ian Groom, Tim Weber, Sean D Tucker, Discovery Channel, Toyota Airsports, and Paramount Pictures. In 2018, Coleman trained the lead actors starring in Top Gun: Maverick featuring Tom Cruise, Val Kilmer, and Jennifer Connelly. Coleman conducted 140 G tolerance training flights in an Extra EA-300 with actors Glen Powell, Miles Teller, Monica Barbaro, Jay Ellis, Lewis Pullman, and Danny Ramirez in a flight training regime designed by Tom Cruise. These aerobatic flights were conducted in order to prepare the actors for flight in F/A-18E/F Super Hornets during actual filming.

Awards 
Coleman won two Collier Trophies for his involvement in the development of the McDonnel Douglas C-17 Globemaster (1994) and Scaled Composites’ SpaceShipOne (2004). Coleman was also part of the Scaled Composites team that won the Ansari X Prize which was a space competition in which the X Prize Foundation offered a cash prize for the first non-government organization to launch a reusable crewed spacecraft into space twice within two weeks.

References

External links 
Official website
 

Living people
Engineers from Michigan
Collier Trophy recipients
Aircraft designers
American aerospace engineers
American aviators
The Spaceship Company
American test pilots
Year of birth missing (living people)
Scaled Composites
Scaled Composites Tier One program
 University of Michigan alumni